Dysspastus fallax is a moth of the family Autostichidae. It is found on the Iberian Peninsula and in France.

References

Moths described in 1961
Dysspastus
Moths of Europe